Iron(III) bromide is the chemical compound with the formula FeBr3.  Also known as ferric bromide, this red-brown odorless compound is used as a Lewis acid catalyst in the halogenation of aromatic compounds. It dissolves in water to give acidic solutions.

Structure, synthesis and basic properties
FeBr3 forms a polymeric structure featuring six-coordinate, octahedral Fe centers.  Although inexpensively available commercially, FeBr3 can be prepared by treatment of iron metal with bromine:
2 Fe  +  3 Br2  →  2 FeBr3

Above 200 °C, FeBr3 decomposes to ferrous bromide:
2FeBr3  →  2FeBr2  +  Br2
Iron(III) chloride is considerably more stable, reflecting the greater oxidizing power of chlorine.   FeI3 is not stable, as iron(III) will oxidize iodide ions.

Uses
Ferric bromide is occasionally used as an oxidant in organic chemistry, e.g. for the conversion of alcohols to ketones.  It is used as a Lewis acidic catalyst for bromination of aromatic compounds.  For the latter applications, it is often generated in situ.

See also
Iron(II) bromide, the lower bromide of iron

References

Iron(III) compounds
Bromides
Metal halides